Lucien Fenaux (1911-1969) was a French sculptor. He won the Prix de Rome in sculpture in 1943. He lived at the Villa Medici in 1946–1947. He designed sculptures in the church in Aunay-sur-Odon.

References

1911 births
1969 deaths
People from Hazebrouck
French male sculptors
20th-century French sculptors
Prix de Rome winners